General Sir Henry Brackenbury,  (1 September 1837 – 20 April 1914) was a British Army officer who was assistant to Garnet Wolseley in the 1870s and became part of his 'Ring' of loyal officers. He also wrote several books of military history and memoirs.

Life and career 
Henry Brackenbury was born in Bolingbroke, Lincolnshire on 1 September 1837 and was a younger brother of Charles Booth Brackenbury. Henry was educated at Tonbridge School and Eton, then at the Royal Military Academy, Woolwich. He joined the British Army in 1856, served in the Central Indian Campaign in 1857–58 and observed the Franco-Prussian War in 1870–71.

After making Wolseley's acquaintance, Brackenbury offered to join his Ashanti Campaign (1873–74) at which time he became part of the Wolseley ring, and later acted as his military secretary in the Zulu War of 1879–80. Wolseley thought highly of his talents and helped advance his career. However, Brackenbury was unpopular with other colleagues and with Lady Wolseley.

He became Private Secretary to the Viceroy of India in 1880, acted as British Military attaché in Paris between 1881 and 1882, and then became assistant Under-Secretary to the Lord Lieutenant of Ireland. He had a senior role in the River Column in Egypt in 1884–85.

He was promoted to major general for distinguished service in the field, then became director of Military Intelligence in 1886. From 1891 he was a member of the Council of the Viceroy of India, and in 1896 became president of the War Office Ordnance Committee until 1899. He was made colonel commandant of the Royal Artillery in 1897, and promoted to the rank of a full general on 26 September 1901.

He was appointed Director-General of Ordnance in 1899, and as such was responsible for army ordnance (including the reserves of arms, ammunitions, clothing and other equipment) throughout the Second Boer War, which took place in South Africa from October 1899 to June 1902. For his service during the war, he was promoted to a Knight Grand Cross of the Order of the Bath (GCB) in the April 1901 South African War honours list. Following the end of the war, he gave evidence to the Elgin Commission on the conduct of the war.

Towards the end of his career Brackenbury was a patron of Robertson and helped arrange his appointment to do intelligence work at the War Office.

Brackenbury retired in 1904 and was made a Privy Councillor.
His married first in 1861 Emilia Halswell (who died in 1905, when they had long been separated), and secondly in 1905 Edith Desanges. He died on 20 April 1914 in Nice, France.

Decorations 
Most Honourable Order of the Bath
 Companion, CB 1880
 Knight Commander, KCB 1894
 Knight Grand Cross, GCB, 29 November 1900, in recognition of services in connection with the Campaign in South Africa 1899-1900

Order of the Star of India
 Knight Commander, KCSI 1896 for service as Member of Council in India

Publications 
 The Last Campaign of Hanover, 1870
 The Tactics of the Three Arms, 1873
 Narrative of the Ashantee War (2 vol.) 1874
 The River Column, 1885
 Some Memories of My Spare Time, 1909

See also
Ashanti Confederacy

References

Sources

Further reading

1837 births
1914 deaths
British Army generals
British Army personnel of the Anglo-Zulu War
British Army personnel of the Mahdist War
British military personnel of the Indian Rebellion of 1857
British military personnel of the Third Anglo-Ashanti War
Graduates of the Royal Military Academy, Woolwich
Knights Commander of the Order of the Star of India
Knights Grand Cross of the Order of the Bath
Members of the Privy Council of the United Kingdom
People educated at Eton College
People from East Lindsey District
Military personnel from Lincolnshire